Shorea ferruginea is a tree in the family Dipterocarpaceae, native to Borneo. The specific epithet ferruginea means "rust-coloured", referring to the leaf when dry.

Description
The initially smooth bark becomes fissured and flaky.

Distribution and habitat
Shorea ferruginea is endemic to Borneo.

Conservation
Shorea ferruginea has been assessed as vulnerable on the IUCN Red List. It is threatened by conversion of land for intensive agriculture, especially palm oil plantations. It is also threatened by logging for its timber. Coal mining occurs near part of the species' habitat in Kalimantan. The increasing frequency and severity of wildfires threatens the species. Shorea ferruginea does occur in a number of protected areas.

References

ferruginea
Endemic flora of Borneo
Plants described in 1894